Odostomia cookeana is a species of sea snail, a marine gastropod mollusc in the family Pyramidellidae, the pyrams and their allies.

The epithet in this species  refers to Mss J. M. Cooke, of San Diego,

Description
The shell is elongate-ovate, very narrowly umbilicated, yellowish-white. It measures 3.2 mm. The nuclear whorls are very obliquely immersed in the first of the succeeding turns. The four post-nuclear whorls are very high between the sutures where they are very moderately rounded.  They are marked by rather strong incremental lines and very numerous fine spiral striations. The periphery and the base of the body whorl are  somewhat inflated, the latter strongly rounded and marked like the spire. The oval aperture is large. The posterior angle is acute. The outer lip is thin. The inner lipis  decidedly oblique, quite strongly curved in the middle and somewhat reflected. It is provided with an oblique fold at its insertion, which is strong within and tapers to a vanishing point at the free edge of the columella. The parietal wall glazed with a thin callus.

Distribution
This species occurs in the Pacific Ocean off Alaska.

References

External links
 To World Register of Marine Species

cookeana
Gastropods described in 1910